In social media, a story is a function in which the user tells a narrative or provides status messages and information in the form of short, time-limited clips from several automatically running sequences. A story is usually displayed on a user's profile page and thus represents an audiovisual extension to the text-based status function.

Definition 
A story is usually a short, automatic sequence of images or videos that is divided into several sequences, which is accompanied by backgrounds, music, texts, stickers, animations, effects and emojis. The aim of stories is to tell a narrative (e.g. an everyday experience) or to convey a message. Most stories cannot be changed afterwards and are only available for a short time. Hashtags, tagging, and location the reach of a stories can also be added. As with other functions in social networks, the visibility of the stories for groups of people can be adjusted in the settings. Stories are almost exclusively created on a mobile device such as a smartphone or tablet computer and are usually displayed vertically.

History 
With the advent of better cell phone cameras and the increasing popularity of internet-enabled mobile apps, the need has also increased to extend the status function, which has been around for a long time in social networks, to the multimedia area and thereby remove functions of the feed.

In October 2013, Snapchat first introduced the story function. This is a series of snaps that together tell a narrative through a chronological order. A story is deleted after 24 hours. Snapchat became very well known and popular with teenagers because of this feature, among other things. Later other apps would copied this feature. In October 2015, Twitter introduced the story feature called Moments. In 2016, Google introduced the Google AMP Stories service, which enables mobile websites to load faster and be presented in the format of a stories.

In August 2016, Instagram introduced a stories function that deletes the content after 24 hours. The media has often accused the site of copying Snapchat.

In February 2017, the instant messenger WhatsApp introduced the Now Status stories function in beta, which was later renamed Status. In March 2017, a story function was introduced in Facebook for Facebook Messenger. In August 2018, YouTube introduced a stories function that initially was limited to pictures, but now also supports short video clips.

In August 2018, the GIF website Giphy introduced a story function. Also, Netflix has been experimenting in June 2019 in the mobile app version a stories featuring film trailer and teaser.

In March 2022, TikTok added the story feature which allowed users to create 15 second long videos that delete after 24 hours.

Usage statistics 
In 2019, around 1.5 billion people worldwide every day on average use the stories function in a social network or messenger. In the period between the end of 2018 and April 2019, the growth on the Facebook Messenger Stories service increased in particular. Younger people in particular use this function. More than 20% people aged 18 to 24 use Instagram Stories, while it is just under 2% of those over 55. On Snapchat use in March 2019 after Statista over 190 million users the function on Facebook over 500 million, to more than 500 million Whatsapp and Instagram in December 2018 and over 500 million. On Facebook, an average of 150 million users use the function per day, 300 million on Instagram, 450 million on WhatsApp and 70 million on Facebook Messenger.

In a Facebook survey of 18,000 participants from 12 countries, 68% said they used the stories function at least once a month. It is stated that this influences their purchasing behavior and the advertising website they visited. Stories in the areas of fashion and tourism are particularly popular.

The website Fanpage Karma analyzed several Instagram accounts according to the size of the profiles and determined the average reach of posts and stories per follower. It turned out that posts have a higher reach than stories, which often have less than half the reach.

In online marketing 
Due to the increasing popularity of the stories, it is not only used by private individuals, but also an important part of social media marketing. From an ephemeral perspective, Instagram stories for example have proven to be to be useful to brands for things such as digital campaigns, content marketing, and overall communication. Above all, it is important to convey a brand authentically, visually, but also personally and entertainingly to advertisers using the stories function. Instagram also recognized the potential for charity campaigns and introduced a donation function for stories in July 2019.

Further reading 
 Menon, Devadas (2022-05-01). "Updating 'Stories' on social media and its relationships to contextual age and narcissism: A tale of three platforms – WhatsApp, Instagram and Facebook". Heliyon. 8 (5). https://doi.org/10.1016/j.heliyon.2022.e09412 

 Ruth Page: Narratives Online: Shared Stories in Social Media, Cambridge University Press, 2018,

References 

Social media
Web series
Blogging
Internet culture
Digital marketing